In mathematics, a bilateral hypergeometric series is a series Σan  summed over all integers n, and such that the ratio

an/an+1

of two terms is a rational function of n. The definition of the  generalized hypergeometric series is similar, except that the terms with negative n must vanish; the bilateral series will in general have infinite numbers of non-zero terms for both positive and negative n.

The bilateral hypergeometric series fails to converge for most rational functions, though it can be analytically continued to a function defined for most rational functions. There are several summation formulas giving its values for special values where it does converge.

Definition
The bilateral hypergeometric series pHp is defined by

where

is the rising factorial or Pochhammer symbol.

Usually the variable z is taken to be 1, in which case it is omitted from the notation.
It is possible to define the series pHq with different p and q in a similar way, but this either fails to converge or can be reduced to the usual hypergeometric series by changes of variables.

Convergence and analytic continuation
Suppose that none of the variables a or b are integers, so that all the terms of the series are finite and non-zero. Then the terms with n<0 diverge if |z| <1, and the terms with n>0 diverge if |z| >1, so the series cannot converge unless |z|=1. When |z|=1, the series converges if 

The bilateral hypergeometric series can be analytically continued to a multivalued meromorphic function of several variables whose singularities are
branch points at z = 0 and z=1 and simple poles at ai = −1, −2,... and bi = 0, 1, 2, ...
This can be done as follows. Suppose that none of the a or b variables are integers. The terms with n positive converge for |z| <1 to a function satisfying an inhomogeneous linear equation with singularities at z = 0 and z=1, so can be continued to a multivalued function with these points as branch points. Similarly the terms with n negative converge for |z| >1 to a function satisfying an inhomogeneous linear equation with singularities at z = 0 and z=1, so can also be continued to a multivalued function with these points as branch points. The sum of these functions gives the analytic continuation of the bilateral hypergeometric series to all values of z other than 0 and 1, and satisfies a linear differential equation in z similar to the hypergeometric differential equation.

Summation formulas

Dougall's bilateral sum

This is sometimes written in the equivalent form

Bailey's formula
 gave the following generalization of Dougall's formula:

where

See also
Basic bilateral hypergeometric series

References
 
 
  (there is a 2008 paperback with )

Hypergeometric functions